The Third Enemy Offensive forms part of the Seven Enemy Offensives framework in Yugoslav historiography. It consisted of two major counter-insurgency operations conducted in occupied Yugoslavia during 1942. These were:
Operation Trio, a joint German-Italian counter-insurgency operation in eastern Bosnia from 20 April to 13 May 1942
1942 Montenegro offensive, an Italian-led counter-insurgency operation in the Italian governorate of Montenegro and eastern Herzegovina from mid-May to June 1942

Anti-partisan operations of World War II
Battles and operations of World War II
Eastern European theatre of World War II
Military operations of World War II involving Germany
!
Yugoslavia in World War II